Glen Herrscher Redd (June 17, 1958 – November 17, 2007) was a professional American football player who played linebacker for five seasons for the New Orleans Saints and the Indianapolis Colts. Redd was an anchor of the 1980 BYU defense. He played outside linebacker for BYU and was switched to inside when he was drafted by the New Orleans Saints.  He also received a scholarship offer from Utah State University to play fullback. In September 1989, he married Cindi Crook, and they had three children; Clint, Lexi, and Kadi. Redd died of cancer in Plain City, Utah where he lived on November 17,
2007.

References

1958 births
Sportspeople from Ogden, Utah
Players of American football from Utah
American football linebackers
BYU Cougars football players
New Orleans Saints players
Indianapolis Colts players
2007 deaths
People from Plain City, Utah